Giulio Bosetti (26 December 1930 – 24 December 2009) was an Italian actor and director.

Career
Giulio Bosetti appeared in film, on television and on stage over 30 times.  In 1972, he narrated the television special La vita di Leonardo da Vinci. The biography succeeded in winning a Golden Globe for Best TV Special, and Bosetti was nominated for an Emmy for Outstanding Continued performance by an Actor in a Leading Role.

One of his last works was Il Divo, in which he portrayed the journalist Eugenio Scalfari. The film deals with the life of Italy's Giulio Andreotti, a man elected Prime Minister by Parliament seven times since it was established in 1946.

Death
Giulio Bosetti died two days short of his 79th birthday in Milan from cancer.

Filmography

References

1930 births
2009 deaths
Deaths from cancer in Lombardy
Italian male film actors
Italian film directors
Italian male stage actors
Italian male television actors
Male actors from Milan
Actors from Bergamo
Accademia Nazionale di Arte Drammatica Silvio D'Amico alumni
Film people from Bergamo